Zhao Xin, was originally a marquis of Xiongnu heritage, who previously surrendered to the Han Dynasty of China.

Life
Zhao Xin's name was probably adopted through during his service to Han.  He was one of the six generals led by Wei Qing during an expedition in 123 BC, and led a 3,000-strong vanguard force along with fellow general Su Jian.  Upon clashing with the Xiongnu forces, he defected back to Xiongnu, while Sun Jian managed to escape after his forces were annihilated.  A Xiongnu fortress named after him was constructed near the Khangai Mountains, soon after his submission to Yixixie Chanyu.  That fortress was later completely destroyed by Wei Qing's forces during the finishing phase of the Battle of Mobei.

See also
 Battle of Mobei

References
 Ban Gu et al., Hanshu. Beijing: Zhonghua Shuju, 1962. 
 Sima Guang, comp. Zizhi Tongjian. Beijing: Zhonghua Shuju, 1956. 

Han dynasty generals
Xiongnu
2nd-century BC Chinese people